Ai-Kon is an annual three-day anime convention held on a weekend during the month of July in Winnipeg, Manitoba, Canada. Ai-Kon was first held at the University of Manitoba in 2001 and is currently held at the RBC Convention Centre. The convention's name is a blend of the words ai (Japanese for love) and convention and is derived from its slogan "For the love of anime". The word ai was also chosen to play on the fact that the club had a magazine they called Anime Injection.

Programming
Ai-Kon provides a wide variety of on mandate programming put on by committee staff, members of the community, guests and industry partners. Streaming/showing rooms run 24-hours during the conventions featuring titles in both Japanese and English languages. Alongside anime, the convention also hosts many video game and Japanese culture related activities.

Additional convention events include:
Marketplace: Dealer's Room and an Artists Alley
Cosplay events: Cosplay Contest, Cosplay Skills Faire, workshops
Gamer's Lounge: no entry tournaments, various video games stations, tabletop gaming area, charity event for Extra Life
Music: Saturday Dance, Dance Showcase
Panels and workshops: Guests, staff, cultural workshops, fan based/ members of the community, industry, game shows, fashion shows
Other attractions: Cultural room, Maid Cafe, Gundam Builders World Cup National qualifiers, Tamiya mini 4awd stock car tournament, pop-up partnered experiences, art auction

History
Ai-Kon was first held in July 2001 at the University of Manitoba in Winnipeg, Manitoba, and was run by the University of Manitoba Anime Club (UMAnime). The founding members were the club's executive staff, Kristjanna Thorarinson, Riki Lecotey, Kwan Fu Sit, Tong Lin, Cathleen Ma, Tim Groner, Geoff Wright, and Jeff Agapito. 
At the time the club held one-day events but they had so many things planned that summer, the club decided on making it a two-day event but added a dance on Friday evenings, making it a 3-day convention. In 2002 the event went on hiatus for one year, due to changes within the club, and in July 2003 a second Ai-Kon was held at the university.

Today, Ai-Kon is a non-profit organization that is run by a volunteer committee. It continues to be held annually in Winnipeg each summer.

In 2011, as a celebration of the 10 year anniversary, Ai-Kon held a one-day event in January called "The Ai-Kon Winter Festival". This one-day event is now held annually in February under the name "Winterfest".

Event history

Mascot 
Aiko is a fictional cheerful, stylish, energetic anime girl with pink hair and blue eyes. Her various incarnations coordinate with the convention's yearly theme. The mascot is selected annually from an open contest. Aiko's many manifestations are used on convention promotional materials, clothing, badges, and other wearables. Doug is Aiko's fictional younger brother and likewise the Winterfest mascot. He is portrayed as younger, mischievous and playful with white hair and blue eyes.

References

Other sources

External links
Ai-Kon Official Website
Uptown Magazine Ai-Kon 2005 article
Winnipeg Sun 2010 Article
chrisd.ca 2010 Article
Winnipeg Sun 2015 article
Winnipeg Free Press article
CBC article

Anime conventions in Canada
Culture of Winnipeg
2001 establishments in Manitoba
Recurring events established in 2001